The Bowling Green Stakes is a Grade II American thoroughbred horse race for horses age four years old and older over a distance of  miles on the turf held annually in late July at Saratoga Race Course in Saratoga Springs, New York.

History

The inaugural running of the event was on 11 June 1958 at Belmont Park as the sixth event on the card that day and was won by the French bred horse, Rafty trained by the US Hall of Fame trainer Hollie Hughes in a time of 2:17.

The event is named for the area on the lower tip of Manhattan Island, known as Bowling Green.

In 1963 the event was moved to Aqueduct Racecourse and the distance was increased to 13 furlongs ( miles). The last running of the event at Aqueduct in 1967 is one of the more notable when Poker defeated champions Assagai and his own stablemate, the 1966 US Horse of the Year, Buckpasser who was entering the race with a fifteen race winning streak.

The 1970 winner Fort Marcy would later that year be crowned US Horse of the Year and the 1972 winner Run the Gantlet was the 1971 US Champion Male Turf Horse.

In 1973 the event was classified as Grade II and for several years in the late 1980s the event held Grade I status.

In winning the Bowling Green Handicap on 17 June 1990 at Belmont Park, the 1989 Canadian champion With Approval set a new World Record of 2:10 for  miles on turf. As of today, the record remains unmatched.

The 2008 edition was replaced in its summer spot by the Man o' War Stakes. The Man o' War was moved from a fall schedule to improve turf scheduling competition. In 2015 the New York Racing Association moved the Bowling Green to Saratoga.

Two mares have won this race, Drumtop in 1971 setting a new course record for the  miles distance and Summer Guest in 1973. Drumtop also finished second to Fort Marcy in 1970.

Records
Speed  record: 
 miles:  2:10.20 – With Approval (1990) (new World Record)

Margins: 
 4 lengths – Open Call (1982)

Most wins:
 2 – Whitmore's Conn (2002, 2003)
 2 – Cross Border (2020, 2021)

Most wins by an owner:
 4 – Rokeby Stables (1970, 1972, 1973, 1984)

Most wins by a jockey:
 3 – Jorge Velásquez (1969, 1970, 1982)
 3 – Jerry Bailey (1984, 1991, 2001)
 3 – John Velazquez (1994, 1998, 2012)
 3 – Javier Castellano (2013, 2015, 2016)

Most wins by a trainer:
 4 – William I. Mott (1987, 2001, 2010, 2018)
 4 – Todd Pletcher (2006, 2007, 2015, 2019)

Winners

Notes:

† Filly or Mare

§ Ran as part of an entry

‡ In the 2020 running Sadler's Joy was first past the post but was disqualified for interference in the straight and was placed fourth. Cross Border was declared the winner.

See also
List of American and Canadian Graded races

External links
 Video at YouTube of With Approval setting a new World Record in winning the 1990 Bowling Green Handicap

References

Graded stakes races in the United States
Grade 2 stakes races in the United States
Open middle distance horse races
Horse races in New York (state)
Turf races in the United States
Recurring sporting events established in 1958
1958 establishments in New York (state)
Saratoga Race Course